In the legal profession, a Syllabus is a preliminary section of a court ruling that outlines the core facts and issues of the case and the path that the case has taken prior to reaching the present court.

Methodology
Most legal opinions begin with a syllabus. While the syllabi act as summaries of the cases, they are not considered to be part of the actual decisions. Thus, future cases cannot cite them as precedential to their arguments.

References

Judicial legal terminology